A subframe is a structural component of a vehicle, such as an automobile or an aircraft, that uses a discrete, separate structure within a larger body-on-frame or unit body to carry certain components, such as the engine, drivetrain, or suspension. The subframe is bolted and/or welded to the vehicle. When bolted, it is sometimes equipped with rubber bushings or springs to dampen vibration.

The principal purposes of using a subframe are, to spread high chassis loads over a wide area of relatively thin sheet metal of a monocoque body shell, and to isolate vibrations and harshness from the rest of the body. For example, in an automobile with its powertrain contained in a subframe, forces generated by the engine and transmission can be damped enough that they will not disturb passengers. As a natural development from a car with a full chassis, separate front and rear subframes are used in modern vehicles to reduce the overall weight and cost. In addition a subframe yields benefits to production in that subassemblies can be made which can be introduced to the main bodyshell when required on an automated line.

There are generally three basic forms of the subframe.
 A simple "axle" type which usually carries the lower control arms and steering rack.
 A perimeter frame which carries the above components but in addition supports the engine.
 A perimeter frame which carries the above components but in addition supports the engine, transmission and possibly full suspension. (As used on front wheel drive cars)

A subframe is usually made of pressed steel panels that are much thicker than bodyshell panels, which are welded or spot welded together. The use of hydroformed tubes may also be used.

The revolutionary monocoque transverse engined front wheel drive 1959 Austin Mini, that set the template for modern front wheel drive cars, used front and rear subframes to provide accurate road wheel control while using a stiff lightweight body. The 1961 Jaguar E-type or XKE used a tubular spaceframe type front subframe to mount the engine gearbox and long bonnet / hood, to a monocoque 'tub' passenger compartment.

The subframe saw regular production in the 1960s and 1970s General Motors X platform and F platform bodies and the 1985-05 M platform vans (Astro, Safari).

Subframes are prone to misalignment, which can cause vibration and alignment issues in the suspension and steering components. Misalignment is caused by space between the chassis-subframe mounting bolts and the mounting hole. There are a number of companies in the automotive aftermarket that offer solutions for the subframe misalignment and movement issue, including TyrolSport of the US and Spoon Sports of Japan.

References

Automotive chassis types
Auto parts
Structural system
Structural engineering